Pig City is the title of several works of media:

 Pig City (song), a 1983 song by Brisbane band The Parameters
 Pig City (book), a 2004 book about the Brisbane music scene named after the song
 Pig City (music festival), a 2007 music festival in Brisbane named after the book
 Pig City (symposium), a symposium held the day before the festival

 Pig City (TV series), an animated series about three pig cousins living together
 Pig City (novel), an alternative UK title for the children's novel Sixth Grade Secrets by Louis Sachar